The Green Highways Partnership (GHP) is a voluntary, public/private initiative that aims to encourage the building of green highways and to encourage environmental stewardship through integrated planning, regulatory flexibility, and market-based rewards.

Goal

GHP originally formed to transform transportation infrastructure through environmental streamlining and stewardship, within the mid-Atlantic region, including New Jersey and New York.  By creating a precedent for cross-sector partnering and integrated planning to achieve this ambitious goal, GHP is laying the groundwork for nationwide transferability.

History

In 2002, the Federal Highway Administration (FHWA) named environmental stewardship and streamlining one of three “vital few” goals (along with safety and congestion mitigation).  After this, substantial FHWA investments resulted in a wave of environmentally-focused programs such as Context Sensitive Solutions, the Exemplary Ecosystem Initiative, and others.  The FHWA consulted the United States Environmental Protection Agency’s Mid-Atlantic Region 3 and determined that the effort would require consolidation of the various programs and an interconnected, multidisciplinary organization. They determined that market-based incentives would be the most effective means to achieve their goals.  After an executive planning charrette and culminating forum, followed by a retreat, the Green Highways Partnership began.

Strategy

With an extensive network of environmental, industrial and governmental collaborators, GHP advocates active cooperation and regulatory progressiveness to move beyond the current paradigm.  The combined resources of its partner base allow Green Highways to ensure that sustainability becomes the driving force behind infrastructure development.

Because of GHP's large and diverse partner base, various perspectives can contribute to the green highway lifecycle process.  Green highways require integrated planning that takes into account perspectives of all stakeholders.  GHP often utilizes a charrette process to expedite the design process.

See also
Green building
Green highway construction

References

External links
Green Highways Partnership Website
U.S. Environmental Protection Agency, Region 3
Federal Highway Administration
Low Impact Development Center

Sustainability organizations